"Man With a Belly" is a short story by Stephen King. It was published in Cavalier in December 1978.

Plot summary 
The story opens with John Bracken, a hitman, in the James Memorial Park of an unnamed town; he is waiting for Norma Correzente, who is due to walk home from a casino through the park at 11:00 PM. Bracken has been paid $50,000 by Norma's husband, the 78 year-old Mafia Don Vittorio "Vito the Wop" Correzente, to rape her as punishment for her compulsive gambling. Correzente considers that ordering this deed will show him to be "a man with a belly".

After a violent struggle, Bracken rapes Norma in the park, then passes on Correzente's message that he now considers "that all debts are paid and there is honor again". Norma subsequently persuades Bracken to escort her to her secret second apartment, where they have consensual sex. Afterwards, Norma sets out her hatred of Correzente. The following day, Norma offers Bracken $100,000 of her own money to impregnate her so she can trick Correzente into believing she is giving him an heir, leaving her free to gamble (and enabling her to "kill him with the truth" in the future). Bracken agrees to the deal, and 10 weeks later Norma tests positive on a pregnancy test.

Seven months later, Correzente's consigliore Benito "Benny the Bull" Torreos summons Bracken to Correzente, who is dying and wishes to ask Bracken a question. Torreos informs Bracken that Norma has died in childbirth. Knowing that he will be hunted down if he refuses, Bracken visits Correzente, who informs him that he suffered a stroke while attempting to impregnate Norma, then later suffered a second, larger, stroke while arguing with her. Norma in turn injured herself while running to get him assistance, leading to her own death during labour. Correzente expresses suspicion that the baby - which is in an incubator - has blue eyes, when both he and Norma have brown eyes. Bracken rejects the implication that he is the father, saying "I have my own belly. Do you think I would take my own leavings?" and that the baby's eyes will turn brown, though Correzente will not live to see it.

Publication 
"Man With a Belly" was originally published in Cavalier in December 1978. It was later published in the November/December 1979 issues of Gent. In 2017, it was included in the crime anthology Killer Crimes edited by Richard Chizmar and Brian James Freeman.

Reception 
Rocky Wood considered that the story "has some plot holes and is somewhat unsatisfying" but felt that "all three main characters are conceptually interesting and the storyline bold". Tyson Blue considered the story to lack "King's trademark characteristics of good storytelling and characterization". Patrick McAleer suggested that the story "serves as an example of [King's] critical eye on social and cultural norms".

See also
 Stephen King short fiction bibliography

References

External links 
 "Man With a Belly" at StephenKing.com

Short stories by Stephen King
1978 short stories
Crime short stories
Works about the American Mafia
Works originally published in Cavalier (magazine)